The Social Christian Party (Partido Social Cristiano – PSC) is a Nicaraguan political party with Christian democrat ideology founded in 1957. As of 2006, the PSC was part of the Sandinista Renovation Movement alliance in the 2006 Nicaraguan general election.

Political parties established in 1957
Christian democratic parties in North America
Political parties in Nicaragua
Catholic political parties